Women and children first is a code of conduct sometimes applied in marine disaster evacuations in the 19th and early 20th centuries.

"Women and children first" may refer to:

Women and Children First, a 1980 album by hard rock band Van Halen
Women and Children First, the second part of the double album Peccadillos by folk singer/songwriter Susan Herndon
Women & Children First, a feminist bookstore in Chicago, Illinois